AAW may refer to:

Aviation & military
 Afriqiyah Airways, an airline based in Tripoli, Libya, by ICAO airline code
 Anti-aircraft warfare
 X-53 Active Aeroelastic Wing

Other uses
 Ad-Aware
 All American Wrestling independent professional wrestling company in Berwyn, Illinois
 Against All Will, an American rock band
 American Association of Woodturners
 Arts Academy in the Woods in Fraser, Michigan, United States
 Solong language, a language of Papua New Guinea, by ISO 639-3 language code